Otago Girls' High School (OGHS) is a secondary school in Dunedin, Otago, New Zealand. It was opened 6 February 1871, after a long campaign by Learmonth Whyte Dalrymple. It is reputedly the oldest girls state-run secondary school in the Southern Hemisphere and the sixth oldest of its type in the world.

The school has its own radio show on Otago Access Radio.

History

At its foundation the school occupied a neo-classical building on its present site which it shared with Otago Boys' High School. A new building on another site was built for the boys which they marched away to occupy in 1885. In 1910 the present main block was opened, designed by Edmund Anscombe (1874–1948) and the old building on Tennyson Street was demolished. Anscombe's conception of a rouge-brick Elizabethan mansion, dreaming in the sun, was slowly extended. Temporary structures were replaced in the 1970s by Ministry of Education blocks, contextualised by the use of brick to the Anscombe building. In the 1980s the main block was scheduled for demolition. After protest it was restored and extended by a sympathetic addition designed by Ted McCoy, and in 1987 was listed as a Category I Historic Place. The school has since acquired part of the old King Edward Technical School site. It has erected structures there accessible by way of a pedestrian underpass beneath Smith Street.

The school gained international attention in February 2022 after a Muslim student was beaten for wearing a hijab by her peers, and resulted in the student being hospitalised with a concussion. The incident led to an international and domestic outcry, with support for the student coming from Bella Hadid, Sonny Bill Williams, among others. Two of the students responsible for the attack were subsequently expelled while a third was referred to counselling. Principal Bridget Davidson confirmed that the school was working with the victims, Muslim community and Police to address the bullying and assault. Otago Muslim Association chairman Dr Mohammad Rizwan welcomed the outcome.

Notable alumnae

 Mina Arndt - artist
 Ethel Benjamin - New Zealand's first female lawyer
 Kelly Brazier - rugby union player
 Kushana Bush - artist
 Silvia Cartwright - former Governor General of New Zealand
 Ann Chapman - first woman to lead an Antarctic expedition
 Mai Chen - constitutional lawyer
 Constance Clyde - writer
 Margaret Cruickshank - New Zealand's first female medical doctor
 Elizabeth Gunn - paediatrician
 Alison Holst - cook
 Grace Joel - painter
 Millie Lovelock - student journalist, singer-songwriter-guitarist
 Juliet Marillier - author
 Shona McFarlane - artist, journalist and broadcaster
 Judith Medlicott - family lawyer and former University of Otago Chancellor
 Emily Hancock Siedeberg - New Zealand's first female medical graduate
 Patricia Payne (mezzo-soprano) - opera singer
 Raylene Ramsay - French culture researcher
 Olga Stringfellow - writer
 Nancy Tichborne - watercolour artist
 Yvette Williams - first New Zealand woman to win an Olympic gold medal

Notable faculty 

 Katherine Browning
 Jessie Buckland
 Clare Mallory
 Maria Marchant

References

External links 
 Official Website
 Dictionary of New Zealand Biography on Learmonth White Dalrymple

Heritage New Zealand Category 1 historic places in Otago
Girls' schools in New Zealand
Educational institutions established in 1871
Secondary schools in Dunedin
Edmund Anscombe buildings
1871 establishments in New Zealand
Association of Community Access Broadcasters
1910s architecture in New Zealand
Alliance of Girls' Schools Australasia
Central Dunedin